The British Covered Court Championships (BCCC) was an indoor tennis event held from 1885 through 1971 and played in London, England. The dates of the tournament fluctuated between October and March.

History
For its first five years the tournament was held at the Hyde Park Lawn Tennis Club in Porchester Square, London and consisted only of a men's singles competition. In 1890, when it was decided to add a women's singles and men's doubles competition, the tournament moved to the Queen's Club in London although the men's singles remained at Hyde Park until 1895. The mixed doubles event was added to the championships in 1898. A third court was added to the championships in 1912 and, like the original two courts, it had a wooden surface. In 1923 the Challenge Round system, allowing the champion to skip next year's competition and only play the winner of that competition, was abolished. In 1925 the tournament was merged with the London Covered Court Championships. The women's doubles event was added to the tournament in 1934 and the tournament was renamed to The National Covered Court Championships. From its inception it grew into an important event through the first half of the 20th century, but by the late 1950s its stature had diminished greatly and in 1966 they couldn't find a sponsor at all. In 1968 the BCCC became part of the first Dewar Cup circuit but that was its final year at Queens Club.  In 1969 it merged with the Wembley Championship while continuing to be called the British Covered Court Championships and it was an official ILTF Grand Prix event in 1970 and 1971. With several top players, who were part of the World Championship Tennis circuit, barred from competition in 1972, and no sponsors to be found, the tournament was discontinued.

Frenchman Jean Borotra is the male record holder with eleven singles titles and British Dorothea Douglass Chambers holds the record for women with seven singles titles.

Champions

Men's singles

Women's singles

Records

Men's singles
Source: 
Most titles:  Jean Borotra, 11
Most consecutive titles:  Jean Borotra, 6
Most finals:  Jean Borotra, 13
Most consecutive finals:  Jean Borotra, 9
Most matches played:  Major Ritchie, 83
Most matches won:  Jean Borotra, (67)
Most consecutive match wins:  Jean Borotra, 35
Most editions played:  Major Ritchie, 30
Best match winning %: André Gobert 94.12% 
Longest final:  Laurence Doherty v  Major Ritchie, result: 6–2, 8–10, 5–7, 6–4, 6–3, 57 games, 1904
Shortest final:  Jean Borotra v  Nigel Sharpe, result: 6–0, 6–2, 6–0, 20 games, 1935
Title won with the fewest games lost,  Ernest Wool Lewis, 22, 1887
Oldest champion:  Jean Borotra, 51y 1m and 28d, 1949
Youngest champion:  Edward Lake Williams, 19y 9m and 12d, 1886

See also
 British Hard Court Championships

References

 

Indoor tennis tournaments
Tennis tournaments in England
Wood court tennis tournaments
1885 establishments in the United Kingdom
1971 disestablishments in the United Kingdom
Recurring sporting events established in 1885
Recurring events disestablished in 1971
Tennis in London
Defunct tennis tournaments in the United Kingdom